Giovanni Francesco Lucchini (1 January 1755  – 1826) was an Italian architect.

He was born and died in Bergamo, the son of architect Luca Lucchini, he is best known for designing the Teatro Donizetti in Bergamo.

References

1755 births
1826 deaths
18th-century Italian architects
19th-century Italian architects
Italian neoclassical architects
Architects from Lombardy
People from Bergamo